Italy competed at the 1988 Winter Olympics in Calgary, Alberta, Canada, winning 2 gold, 1 silver and 2 bronze medals.

Medalists

Competitors
The following is the list of number of competitors in the Games.

Alpine skiing

Men

Men's combined

Women

Women's combined

Biathlon

Men

Men's 4 x 7.5 km relay

 1 A penalty loop of 150 metres had to be skied per missed target.
 2 One minute added per missed target.

Bobsleigh

Cross-country skiing

Men

 C = Classical style, F = Freestyle

Men's 4 × 10 km relay

Women

 C = Classical style, F = Freestyle

Women's 4 × 5 km relay

Figure skating

Men

Women

Ice Dancing

Luge

Men

(Men's) Doubles

Women

Ski jumping

Speed skating

Men

Women

References 

 Official Olympic Reports
 International Olympic Committee results database
 Olympic Winter Games 1988, full results by sports-reference.com

Nations at the 1988 Winter Olympics
1988
Winter